The mass media in Gabon is primarily monitored by the Gabon government. Although the main newspapers are associated with the government, there are private broadcasters, and private weekly newspapers that are mostly controlled by opposition parties.

There are two major television stations. One is a French radio network and the other is a provincial station.

Press
 located in Libreville, is the government controlled daily newspaper.

List of publications

Television

Radiodiffusion-Télévision Gabonaise (RTG) was established in 1959.  Radio Télévision Gabonaise is one of the state run television stations. Two channels are operated under their network.

Télé africa is one of the four privately owned television stations.

Radio

In 1980, a commercial radio station, was founded. In 2003 it was estimated that about 50% of the population owns radios. 

Examples of radio stations include:
 Radio Frequence 3 (est. 1996)
 Radio Generation Novelle (est. 1996)
 Radio Mandarine (est. 1995)
 Radio Soleil (est. 1995)
 Radio Unite (est. 1996)

News Agencies
 (AGP) is an online news agency in the French language. Foreign Internet News Media includes: Africa Intelligence, Africa Time, Afrik, Afrol, All Africa, Ici Cemac, Index Mundi, IRIN, IZF, Relif Web, and Topix.

Internet

By 2011, approximately 109,000 people were determined to be Internet users.

Telecommunications
Gabon's oil resources and the revenue that is generated from oil rank the country high among the wealthy nations in Africa. The income in Gabon has major discrepancies. However, the gross domestic profit is one of well above the average in comparison to other African nations. In 1999, the telecommunications market become liberalized. The government established an independent regulatory authority. There mobile telephone licenses and two Internet Service Providers (ISP) licenses were also established. By 2008, Gabon Telecom became privatized when Vivendi-controlled Maroc Telecom purchased a large amount of stock. The Ministry of Information, Post and Technology's telecom operations are privitazations, acquisitions and new licenses. It includes fixed, mobile, and broadband. Gabon has one of the most penetrated mobile markets among in Africa. The major service providers include Zain, Gabon's Telecom's Libertis, and Etisalat's Moov.

Freedom of speech

The Constitution of Gabon was adopted on March 26, 1991. There has been five amendments to the constitution since it was implemented in 1991. The Constitution protects the freedom of speech and the freedom of press. In the Constitution's fundamental principles and rights, the second right states: "Freedom of conscience, thought, opinion, expression, communication, and the free practise of religion shall be guaranteed to all, under the reservation of respect of public order."

See also
 Telecommunications in Gabon
 Telephone numbers in Gabon

References

Bibliography
  (Includes broadcasting)

External links
 

 
Gabon
Gabon